On a Mission is the second studio album by American country music group Trick Pony. It was released in 2002 as their final album for Warner Bros. Records. The album's singles were "On a Mission" and "A Boy Like You". "Nobody Ever Died of a Broken Heart" was recorded in 2006 by Cowboy Crush, who released it as a single. Willie Nelson's hit single "Whiskey River" is also covered here.

Track listing

Personnel

Trick Pony
Keith Burns - acoustic guitar, vocals
Ira Dean - bass guitar, electric guitar, vocals
Heidi Newfield - harmonica, vocals

Additional Musicians
Kenny Aronoff - drums
Bruce Bouton - pedal steel guitar
Pat Buchanan - electric guitar
Shannon Forrest - drums
Rob Hajacos - fiddle
John Hobbs - keyboards
John Jorgenson - electric guitar
Randy Kohrs - dobro
Andy Leftwich - fiddle
Brian Nelson - drums
Willie Nelson - acoustic guitar and vocals on "Whiskey River"
Michael Spriggs - acoustic guitar
Jonathan Yudkin - violin

Charts

Weekly charts

Year-end charts

Singles

References

2002 albums
Trick Pony albums
Warner Records albums